Chris Heckenberg (born 15 August 1998) is a soccer player who plays as a midfielder for South Georgia Tormenta in the USL League One. Born in the United States, he has represented Australia at youth level.

Career

Youth, College & Amateur
Heckenberg was born in Santa Clara, California, but grew up in Melbourne, Australia, attending the Berwick Grammar School, where he won the excellence in soccer award for four consecutive years, and his team to win a championship three times.

In 2017, Heckenberg attended California Baptist University to play college soccer, going on to make 85 appearances for the Lancers, scoring one goal and tallying 14 assists. In his senior year, Heckenberg earned All-WAC Honorable Mention honours and All-Far West Region Second Team honours.

During the 2021 season, Heckenberg also played in the USL League Two with South Georgia Tormenta 2, who helped to make the playoffs.

Professional
On 18 March 2022, Heckenberg signed with USL League One side South Georgia Tormenta ahead of their 2022 season. He made his professional debut on 2 April 2022, starting in a 1–0 loss to North Carolina FC.

International career
Heckenberg has represented the Australia men's national soccer team at under-19 level.

References

External links 
 

1998 births
Living people
American soccer players
Australian soccer players
Association football midfielders
California Baptist Lancers men's soccer players
Tormenta FC players
Tormenta FC 2 players
Soccer players from California
Soccer players from Melbourne
USL League One players
USL League Two players